Dmitry Mikhaylovich Kovalev (born 15 March 1991) is a Russian male volleyball player. He is part of the Russia men's national volleyball team. On club level he plays for VC Zenit Saint Petersburg.

Achievements

National team
 2018  FIVB Nations League
 2019  FIVB Nations League

References

External links
 Dmitry Kovalev at the International Volleyball Federation
 
 Dmitry Mikhailovich Kovalev at WorldofVolley

1991 births
Living people
Russian men's volleyball players
Place of birth missing (living people)
Ural Ufa volleyball players
Sportspeople from Perm, Russia
European Games medalists in volleyball
European Games bronze medalists for Russia
VC Zenit Saint Petersburg players
VC Belogorie players